The South Darfur gubernatorial election took place on 11–15 April 2010, alongside the wider Sudanese general election, to elect the Governor of South Darfur.

Results

References

Gubernatorial elections in Sudan